Amir Fatah Widjajakusuma (born ) was a commandant of DI/TII Central Java from 1949 to 1950.

Early life 
Fatah was born around 1923 in Kroya, Cilacap with the name Suhario. In the Dutch era, he joined Jong Islamieten Bond and Ansor Youth Movement. Under the Japanese occupation, he entered an underground resistance movement in Jakarta.

Indonesia National Revolution 

He became Hisbullah Commandant in Sidoarjo dan Mojokerto region and leader of Hisbullah field leader during Battle of Surabaya. In 1946, Sudirman sent Suhario to West Java to ensure West Javanese loyalty to Indonesia.

Suhario had a close relationship with Kartosoewirjo. In February 1947, his forces escorted Kartosoewirjo to Malang to attend the plenary session of Central Indonesian National Committee. In Malang, he became Chief of Staff of the August 17th Division. Also, he participated in politics by joining Masyumi and became a member of the party's committee. 

In mid-August 1948, Suhario, with his three Hisbullah companies, moved to the Brebes-Tegal area to wage guerilla war against the Dutch and changed his name to Amir Fatah Widajakusuma.

In September 1948, Fatah tried to meet Kartosoewirjo in West Java to convince him not to proclaim an Islamic state and to remain loyal to Indonesia. In the middle of the journey, Fatah met Kartosoewirjo's envoy, Kamran Cakrabuana. From his meeting with Kamran, Fatah changed his mind from opposing Kartosoewirjo's Islamic state conception to supporting it. He later decided not to meet Kartosoewirjo due to the challenging terrain and returned to Tegal-Brebes instead. As he arrived in the Brebes-Tegal area, Fatah founded Majels Islam and formed a battalion loyal to Darul Islam, Syarif Hidayat Wijayakusuma Battalion, in which he was appointed as the commandant. Nevertheless, Fatah remained loyal to the Republican Government.

On 19 December 1948 Dutch launched Operation Kraai and TNI units, which were forced to move to the Republican control area due to the Renville Agreement, retreated to their respective origin to wage guerrilla against Dutch and formed military government. In Brebes-Tegal, TNI units returnee formed a military government named Sub Wehkreise Slamet III (SWKS III). Fatah was appointed as the chief security coordinator of SWKS III.

Darul Islam rebellion 

As time went on, the relations between Fatah with SWKS III deteriorated. He felt threatened by the presence of the TNI military government in the Brebes-Tegal area because it has a close relationship with the left wing group. Moreover, the government did not appreciate Fatah's effort to fight against the Dutch and tried to disarm Fatah's forces. Hence, on 28 April 1949, Amir Fatah proclaimed the establishment of the Islamic State of Indonesia in Pengarasan, Brebes.

Fatah launched the first attack against TNI on 5 May 1949 in Bentarsari, Brebes, and managed to occupy the village for two days. Under his leadership, DI/TII launched many attacks on police and TNI posts in Brebes and Tegal Regency and managed to occupy Brebes on early January 1950 for a short time. Likewise, he was accused as a mastermind of terrors in some villages in Brebes-Tegal area. In November 1950, DI/TII underwent reorganization by disbanding Syarif Hidayat Wijayakusuma Battalion and creating a new division, Division III/Syarif Hidayat.

In November 1950, Mohammad Natsir offered Fatah to surrender. He accepted it because he was dismayed with the decision of DI/TII reorganization in which he only got the position of Brigade Commandant on Division III/Syarif Hidayat, not the head of division staff. However, he had to go to West Java to Kartosoewirjo to consult about the surrender offer.

On 30 November 1950, Amir Fatah traveled to West Java with his 150 soldiers. On his way to West Java, he faced numerous battles with TNI. Eventually, Amir Fatah and his forces surrender to TNI in Calingcing, Tasikmalaya on 20 December 1950. Two days later, he was arrested by TNI in Cisayong, Tasikmalaya.

Post Darul Islam rebellion 
Fatah was imprisoned in Nusa Kambangan and later transferred to unknown prison in West Java.

After he was released from prison, he went abroad to several countries in America and Europe. In 1968, he decided to settle in South Korea. By 1976, he was a member of the mosque committee in Seoul and worked at Indonesian Embassy in Seoul.

Personal life 
Fatah was married to a South Korean woman and had two sons.

References 

1923 births
Possibly living people
Indonesian independence activists
Indonesian Islamists
Indonesian Muslims
Indonesian rebels